The 15th Kisei 15th iteration of the Kisei tournament, a tournament in the board game go. It was won by Kobayashi Koichi, the defending champion, and held in Japan in 1991. Kobayashi won 4 games to 3 over Kato Masao in the final.

Tournament 

Kisei (Go)
1991 in go